Fatima Batul Mukhtar is a Nigerian academician, a professor of botany. Her research interest are centered on "growth regulation, biostatistics, biotechnology and plant conservation". she was appointed Vice Chancellor of Federal University Dutse by President Muhammadu Buhari. she served between 2016 and 2021.

Early life and education 
Fatima was born on 23 May 1963 in Kano Municipal Local Government Area of  Kano State. She attended Shahuchi Primary School and Shekara Girls Boarding Primary School, she also attended Government Girls College, Dala. She obtained 1st degree in Botany from Ahmadu Bello University in 1984, she also obtained 2nd and 3rd degree from Bayero University in 1994 and 2005 respectively. She enrolled in an Agricultural biotechnology course in Michigan State University in 2012.

Career
Fatima started her career in 1994 at Bayero University Kano as Assistant Lecturer up to professor of  Botany in 2010 she held some responsibilities form Level Coordinator to Head of the Plant Science Department

She is the member of Northwest University, Kano one of the founding academic administrators at Northwest University Kano, and was the  Dean Faculty of science and also the  Deputy Vice Chancellor of Northwest University Kano in 2015,. where she chaired ICT Committee, Hospital Revolving Fund Committee, and Budget Monitoring and Performance Committee.

Fatima become the 2nd the Vice-Chancellor Federal University Dutse who was appointed by President Muhammad Buhari on 14 February 2016.

References

External links 
 Bayero University profile

1963 births
Living people
Nigerian women academics
Ahmadu Bello University alumni
Bayero University Kano alumni
People from Kano
Vice-Chancellors of Nigerian universities
21st-century botanists
Women botanists
Nigerian biologists